Casino Magic is a casino brand owned by Pinnacle Entertainment, from its acquisition of Casino Magic Corp. It may refer to:

Casino Magic Bay St. Louis (now Hollywood Casino Gulf Coast)
Casino Magic Biloxi (now Margaritaville Resort Biloxi)
Casino Magic Bossier City (now Boomtown Bossier City)
Casino Magic Junin de los Andes
Casino Magic Neuquén
Casino Magic San Martin de los Andes